Abbasabad (also Romanized as ‘Abbāsābād) is a village in Alvir Rural District, Kharqan District, Zarandieh County, Markazi Province, Iran. At the 2006 census, its population was 424, in 130 families.

References 

Populated places in Zarandieh County